Julius Converse (December 27, 1798August 16, 1885) was the 34th governor of Vermont, from 1872 to 1874 and the 17th lieutenant governor of Vermont from 1850 to 1852.

Early life and start of political career
Julius Converse was born in Stafford, Connecticut, on December 27, 1798.  He was raised in Vermont, educated at Vermont's Randolph Academy, studied law, and became an attorney in Bethel in 1826.  A Whig, Converse served in the Vermont House of Representatives in 1833 and the Vermont State Senate from 1836 to 1840.

After his state senate term ended, Converse moved to Woodstock, where he resumed practicing law and served as Windsor County State's Attorney from 1844 to 1847. He returned to the Vermont house in 1847, serving until 1849. From 1850 to 1851 Converse was Vermont's lieutenant governor. He became a Republican when the party was founded in the 1850s, and served in the Vermont House for the third time from 1867 to 1868. In 1869 he was an unsuccessful candidate for the nomination for governor, losing to Peter T. Washburn.

Election as governor
In 1872 Converse was selected as the Republican nominee for governor even though he was over 70 years old, was not an active candidate, and had not campaigned for the position.  His nomination was regarded by observers as a way to block the candidacy of railroad magnate Frederick H. Billings, who had only recently returned to Vermont from California, and the renomination of incumbent John W. Stewart, which would break the Republican party's Mountain Rule.  Converse won the general election and served as governor from 1872 to 1874, afterwards living in retirement.

Family
In 1825 Julius Converse was married to Melissa Arnold (born June 1, 1799) of Randolph.  The couple had no children, and Mrs. Converse died on December 12, 1872.  In 1873 Converse married 31-year-old Jane Martin (born North Stratford, New Hampshire, March 24, 1842, died Lowell, Massachusetts, June 22, 1916).  They were the parents of a daughter, Luna Belle Converse (June 13, 1874May 14, 1961).

Death and burial
Governor Converse died on August 16, 1885, while vacationing in Dixville Notch, New Hampshire.  He was buried in Woodstock's River Street Cemetery.

References

1798 births
1885 deaths
Vermont lawyers
People from Stafford, Connecticut
People from Bethel, Vermont
Governors of Vermont
Lieutenant Governors of Vermont
Vermont state senators
Members of the Vermont House of Representatives
Vermont Whigs
19th-century American politicians
Vermont Republicans
Burials in Vermont
Republican Party governors of Vermont
19th-century American lawyers